The 1985–86 Liga Artzit season saw Beitar Netanya promoted to Liga Leumit for the first time in the club's history. Beitar Tel Aviv and Hapoel Lod were also promoted.

At the other end of the table, Hapoel Ramat HaSharon, Hapoel Beit Shemesh and Beitar Haifa were all relegated to Liga Alef. Beitar Netanya's Israel Fogel was the league's top scorer with 17 goals.

Final table

References
Liga Artzit (Final Table) Ma'ariv, 1 June 1986 
Israel 1985/86 RSSSF

Liga Artzit seasons
Israel
2